Heteropterys is a genus in the Malpighiaceae, a family of about 75 genera of flowering plants in the order Malpighiales. Heteropterys comprises over 140 species of woody vines, shrubs, and small trees found in the New World tropics and subtropics from northern Mexico and the West Indies to northern Argentina and southeastern Brazil. One widespread, mostly Caribbean species, H. leona, is also found in low wet places along the coast of West Africa from Senegal to Angola.

References

External links
Heteropterys

Malpighiaceae
Malpighiaceae genera